Arctostaphylos patula is a species of manzanita known by the common name greenleaf manzanita. This manzanita is native to western North America where it grows in coniferous forests at moderate to high elevations.

Distribution

The distribution of Arctostaphylos patula is one of the most widespread of the manzanitas, spanning most of western North America. Its northern edge is in Washington state, eastern edge in Colorado, western edge the North American coast, and southernmost edge in Baja California, Mexico.  It spans in elevation from about 1,500 to 12,000 feet.

Description 
This shrub reaches between 1 and 2 meters in height. It is low to the ground with some of the lower branches rooting in the soil and others extending more outward than upward. The stems are twisting and reddish-brown in color, and shiny due to glandular secretion. The petioles may sometimes have clear-to-glandular hairs. The leaves are oval-shaped to nearly round, and flat, shiny, and smooth. They are 6 centimeters long and four wide at maximum.

The plentiful flowers are white to pink and urn-shaped, each with five small lobes at the mouth of the corolla, hanging in bunches. The fruits are dark brown drupes nearly a centimeter wide, each containing about five hard-coated seeds that can be fused. Seeds are primarily dispersed by seed-caching mammals, and sometimes the fruits are consumed and dispersed by birds and medium-to-large mammals such as bears, coyotes, coatis, and foxes. Seeds require fire followed by cold conditions to germinate; seeds can remain dormant in soil for hundreds of years.

Greenleaf manzanitas in some areas, but not all, produce lignotubers, from which they can reproduce vegetatively.

Uses
Some Plateau Indian tribes drank a tea of greenleaf manzanita as a cathartic.

It is also an important browse plant for deer.

References

External links
Jepson eFlora: Taxon page 
Jepson Manual Treatment
USDA Plants Profile
Ecology

patula
Flora of the Southwestern United States
Flora of Baja California
Flora of California
Flora of Idaho
Flora of Montana
Flora of Nevada
Flora of New Mexico
Flora of Oregon
Flora of the Cascade Range
Flora of the Rocky Mountains
Flora of the Sierra Nevada (United States)
Natural history of the Peninsular Ranges
Natural history of the Transverse Ranges